Cedron is an unincorporated community in Clermont County, in the U.S. state of Ohio.

History
Cedron was platted in 1851. A post office was established at Cedron in 1851, and remained in operation until 1906.

References

Unincorporated communities in Clermont County, Ohio
Unincorporated communities in Ohio